Owranjaq (also Romanized as Ūranjaq) is a village in Barvanan-e Markazi Rural District, Torkamanchay District, Meyaneh County, East Azerbaijan Province, Iran. At the 2006 census, its population was 68, in 15 families.

References 

Populated places in Meyaneh County